Esperanza (Spanish for "Hope"), also known as La Esperanza, is a Cuban village and consejo popular ("people's council", i.e. hamlet) of the municipality of Ranchuelo, in Villa Clara Province. With a 2011 population of 11,555 it is the most populated municipal settlement after Ranchuelo.

History
Founded in 1809 and originally named Puerta de Golpe (i.e. "Slamming Door"), Esperanza is a former municipality merged in Ranchuelo after the administrative re-adjustment of 1976. The old municipality had a total population of 20,759 in 1943, and occupied the northern part of the current municipio of Ranchuelo with an area of 319 km2. It included the villages of Asiento Viejo, Jabonillar, Nuevas, Purial, San José and San Vicente.

Geography
Esperanza is located on a plain surrounded by isolated hills and a lake, and its urban plan is developed with square shape. It lies 12 km in the west of Santa Clara and circa 8 in north of Ranchuelo. The village is 26 km far from Santo Domingo and 65 from Cienfuegos.

Transport
Esperanza is crossed in the middle by the Carretera Central, the Cuban west–east highway, and is the northern end of the national road 112, from Cienfuegos. This road links the village to the A1 motorway (Autopista Nacional), at the exit "Ranchuelo-Cienfuegos", located 7 km in the south. Esperanza counts also a railway station in the junction point between the lines Havana-Santa Clara-Camagüey-Santiago and Santa Clara-Cienfuegos.

See also
Municipalities of Cuba
List of cities in Cuba

References

External links

 Esperanza on EcuRed
 Esperanza (historical info on guije.com)

Populated places in Villa Clara Province
Populated places established in 1809
1809 establishments in North America
1809 establishments in the Spanish Empire